Rathipur Barada Banipith, established in 1942, is one of the oldest school,  in the village Barada of sub-division Ghatal, Paschim Medinipur, West Bengal, India.  It is a co-ed Higher Secondary School.

The school follows the course curricula of West Bengal Board of Secondary Education (WBBSE) and West Bengal Council of Higher Secondary Education (WBCHSE) for Standard 10th and 12th Board examinations respectively.

References

High schools and secondary schools in West Bengal
Schools in Paschim Medinipur district
Educational institutions established in 1942
1942 establishments in India